Madeleine Thérèse Marie Boucherit (13 May 1879 – 14 October 1960) was a French pianist and composer. A teacher at the Conservatoire de Paris, she authored several pieces for piano, specifically for children, gave conducting lessons to young students, and directed the chamber orchestra the petits concerts Mozart that she established.

Her brother, violinist Jules Boucherit, was two years younger than Madeleine and they often concertized together.

She married Georges Le Faure on 2 January 1902.

Works 
Legende for Violin and Viola, copyright 1933
Impressions. Suite for Violin, Viola and Cello. Paris: Éditions Salabert, 1933.
La journée de Suzy, Histoire d’une poupée, ten easy pieces for piano, specially written for children by Magdeleine Boucherit Le Faure, illustrated by R. de la Nézière. Text by G. Le Faure.
 Les Enfants. Divertissement chorégraphique tiré des Caractères. Text by G. Le Faure. Illustrations by Ch. Gir. Score sheet for piano, 1932.
La journée de Goudou "L'ours" for violin & piano, Paris : J. Tallandier, 1954

References 

20th-century French women classical pianists
Academic staff of the Conservatoire de Paris
Women conductors (music)
People from Morlaix
1879 births
1960 deaths
20th-century French composers
20th-century conductors (music)
Women music educators
20th-century women composers